My Favorite Spy is a 1942 comedy film directed by Tay Garnett and featuring Kay Kyser and Ellen Drew.

Plot
This movie is an even more comedic version of Alfred Hitchcock's The 39 Steps (1935 film).

Cast

 Kay Kyser as Kay Kyser
 Ish Kabibble as himself.
 Ellen Drew as Teresa 'Terry' Kyser
 Jane Wyman as Connie
 Robert Armstrong as Harry Robinson
 Helen Westley as Aunst Jessie
 William Demarest as Flower Pot Policeman
 Una O'Connor as Cora
 Lionel Royce as Winters
 Moroni Olsen as Major Allen
 George Cleveland as Gus
 Vaughan Glaser as Colonel Moffett
 Hobart Cavanaugh as Jules
 Chester Clute as Higgenbotham
 Teddy Hart as Complaining Soldier

References

External links
 
 
 
 

1942 films
1940s spy comedy films
American spy comedy films
American black-and-white films
1940s English-language films
Films scored by Roy Webb
Films directed by Tay Garnett
RKO Pictures films
World War II films made in wartime
World War II spy films
1942 comedy films